Yestergroovin' is the thirty-ninth studio album by guitarist Chet Atkins, released in 1970.  Yestergroovin' was nominated for the 1970 Grammy Award for Best Country Instrumental Performance. It did not win, but Atkins's collaboration with Jerry Reed Me and Jerry did. He would be nominated twice in the same category again in 1973.

Reception
Allmusic stated that it is "a throwback to some of his earlier, less-cluttered, more musical albums. It's a relaxed, friendly, assured package... Lovely record; one of his best from this period.".

Track listing

Side one
 "Steeplechase Lane" (Jerry Reed Hubbard)
 "Tennessee Pride"
 "Rocky Top" (Felice Bryant, Boudleaux Bryant)
 "Gotta Travel On"
 "Cherokee" (Ray Noble) – 2:38
 "Country Champagne" – 2:30

Side two
 "Liberty" – 2:42
 "Inka Dinka Doo" – 2:43 (Jimmy Durante, Ben Ryan)
 "Bring Me Sunshine" (Sylvia Dee, Arthur Kent) – 2:40
 "Yestergroovin'"
 "How High the Moon" (Nancy Hamilton, Morgan Lewis) – 3:00

Personnel
Chet Atkins – guitar
Producer – Bob Ferguson
Al Pachucki – engineer
Ray Butts – engineer
Tom Pick – engineer
Joe Clark – cover photo

References

1970 albums
Chet Atkins albums
Albums produced by Bob Ferguson (music)
RCA Victor albums
Pop albums by American artists
Jazz albums by American artists